Michael M. Fidler (10 February 1916 – 5 September 1989) was a British Conservative Party politician.

Fidler was Member of Parliament (MP) for Bury and Radcliffe from 1970 until the October 1974 general election, when he lost his seat to Labour's Frank White.

In the 1974 election, Fidler was targeted by the neo-nazi British Movement.

Fidler was also the first Jewish mayor in Prestwich.
Active in the Jewish community for many years, he was president of the Board of Deputies of British Jews from 1967 until 1973. He founded the lobby group Conservative Friends of Israel.

References 

 Times Guide to the House of Commons October 1974
 Obituary, Jewish Chronicle, 8 September 1989 p. 18

External links 
 

1916 births
1989 deaths
Conservative Party (UK) MPs for English constituencies
UK MPs 1970–1974
UK MPs 1974
British Jews
People educated at Salford Grammar School
Presidents of the Board of Deputies of British Jews
Jewish British politicians